{{Infobox medical condition (new)
| name            = Chromosome 15q trisomy
| synonyms        =  duplication 15 q
| image           =
| alt             =
| caption         =
| pronounce       =
| field           =
| symptoms        =
| complications   =
| onset           =
| duration        =
| types           =
| causes          =
| risks           =
| diagnosis       =
| differential    =
| prevention      =
| treatment       =
| medication      =
| prognosis       =
| frequency       =
| deaths          =
}}Chromosome 15q duplication''' is an extremely rare genetic disorder in which there is an excess copy of a segment of DNA found on the long ("q") arm of human chromosome 15. As a result, affected cells contain a total of 3 copies of the duplicated bases, instead of the usual 2 copies - one inherited from the mother and one from the father - found in a normal human diploid genome.

Signs and symptoms
The disorder is primarily characterized by growth abnormalities, which range from growth retardation to accelerated growth, intellectual disability, and distinctive malformations of the head and face. Additional abnormalities may involve malformation of the skeleton, spine and neck; fingers and/or toes; genitals (particularly in males); and, in some cases, heart problems and seizures.

Diagnosis

The diagnosis of partial trisomy 15q can be made prenatally or postnatally.

The method used for precise diagnosis depends on a number of factors, including the size of the segment of duplicated material, its location, its orientation (inverted), and others.

Treatment
The condition is incurable and treatment is based on alleviating symptoms.

Epidemiology
C15 trisomy affects twice as many males as females. Fewer than 50 cases have been reported.

See also
 Chromosome 15q partial deletion

References

External links 

Genetic disorders with no OMIM